The Bristol 400 is a luxury car produced by the Bristol Aeroplane Company of Great Britain, its first. After World War II in 1947, BAC decided to diversify and formed a car division, which would later be the Bristol Cars company in its own right.  BAC inspected the former BMW car factory in what was now a Soviet-controlled East German factory, and returned to Britain with plans for the 327 model and the six-cylinder engine as official war reparations. Bristol then employed BMW engineer Fritz Fiedler to lead their engine development team. In 1947, the newly formed Bristol Cars released their 400 coupé, a lengthened version of the BMW 327. that featured BMW's double-kidney grille. BAC had also acquired  Frazer Nash  who had held a licence to build BMW models pre war.

Bristol chose to base its first model on the best features of two outstanding pre-war BMWs, namely the 328's engine, and the 326's frame. These were covered with a mainly steel body but with aluminium bonnet, door and boot skins inspired by the BMW 327's. The Bristol 400 featured a slightly modified version of BMW's six-cylinder pushrod engine of 1,971 cc (bore 66 mm, stroke 96 mm). This engine, considered advanced for its time due to its hemispherical combustion chambers and very short inlet and exhaust ports, developed 80 horsepower at 4,500 revs per minute and could carry the 400 to a top speed of around 148 km/h (92 mph) with acceleration to match. In order to maintain a hemispherical combustion chamber, the valves had to be positioned at an angle to the head. In order to drive both sets of valves from a single camshaft, the Bristol engine used a system of rods, followers and bell-cranks to drive the valves on the far side of the engine from the camshaft. Owners soon found that setting and maintaining the numerous clearances in the system was difficult but vital to keep the engine in tune. The gearbox was a four-speed manual with synchromesh on the upper three ratios and a freewheel on first.

The model 400 was the only Bristol to be fitted with a steel and aluminium skin, and had all flat glass, but for the curved rear window, glazed in perspex, which was available to specification with a top hinge. This feature was very welcome on warmer climate export markets, where the sliding door windows provided only marginal ventilation to the passengers.

The 400 featured independent front suspension with a transverse leaf spring and a live axle, located by an A-bracket over the differential case and longitudinal torsion bars with transverse arms and brackets at the rear. It featured a lengthy 2895 mm (114 inch) wheelbase and a very BMW-like grille at the front of its long bonnet. The passenger area was very short, with the spare tyre mounted inside the boot on the first cars, but eventually mounted on the rear hinged boot lid, inside an aluminium cover.

References

External links
 Bristol Owners Club - Bristol Type 400 - 2 litre Saloon
 Erdal Can Alkoçlar
 Buying a Six-Cylinder Bristol
 jel450.com Bristol 2 litre engined cars

400
Sports sedans
Cars introduced in 1947
Rear-wheel-drive vehicles